Number Eight may refer to:

 8 (number), the natural number
 8 (J.J. Cale album) by the American singer-songwriter and musician
 Number 8, Pershore, community arts centre  in England, United Kingdom
 Number Eight (Battlestar Galactica), a character from the 2003 version of the television series Battlestar Galactica
 Number Eight (The Prisoner), a character in the episode "The Chimes of Big Ben" from the television series The Prisoner
 #8, the pseudonym of American musician Corey Taylor, when performing with Slipknot
 Number eight (rugby union), a rugby union position
 The Rifle, No 8 .22 cadet rifle used by UK Cadet Forces

See also
8 (disambiguation)